Kauniainen railway station is a station on the Helsinki commuter rail  network located in the town of Kauniainen, Finland. The station building was designed by architect Bruno Granholm, and it was built in 1908. The station building was heavily damaged in a fire on 2008-08-30.

Connections 
118N (Jorvi-Kamppi, nighttime)
224 (Tuomarila-Leppävaara)
533 (Järvenperä-Matinkylä) 
548 (Jupperi-Tapiola) 
549 (Jorvi-Tapiola)

References

External links 

Railway station
Railway stations in Uusimaa
Railway stations opened in 1908
1908 establishments in the Russian Empire